The East African Half Marathon Championships was an international half marathon competition among athletes from East Africa. The competition was the first dedicated road running championship. The event was contiguous with other regional competitions in the sport of athletics, including the East African Athletics Championships (first held 1995) and the East African Cross Country Championships (first held 1999). An East African Marathon Championships was also briefly held during this period, having only one outing in 2002 (won by Tesfit Berhe).

The inaugural edition was staged in Djibouti and featured an individual men's race only. Three further editions were subsequently held, in 2003, 2005 and finally 2006. The last edition included a women's race for the first time. The competition was not held thereafter.

Editions

References

East African Half Marathon Championships. GBR Athletics. Retrieved 2021-01-23.

Half marathons
Confederation of African Athletics competitions
Sport in East Africa
Defunct athletics competitions
Recurring sporting events established in 2000
Recurring sporting events disestablished in 2006